George Eastman (1854–1932) was an American inventor. 

George Eastman may also refer to:

 George Eastman (actor) (birth name Luigi Montefiori, born 1942), Italian B-movie actor and screenwriter
 USS George Eastman (YAG-39), a "Liberty-type" cargo ship
 George Eastman House, a photography museum
 George Eastman (cricketer) (1903–1991), English cricketer
 George Eastman, a character from the 1951 film A Place in the Sun

Eastman, George